Orange Lake is an unincorporated community in Marion County, Florida, United States.  It is located on US 441, on Orange Lake south of McIntosh.

Ninety-five percent of the community is located in Marion County while the remaining five percent is located in northern neighbor Alachua.  The entire lake is located in Alachua County but is under the jurisdiction of Marion County Water Management.

The Marion County portion of Orange Lake is part of the Ocala Metropolitan Statistical Area, while the Alachua County portion is part of the Gainesville Metropolitan Statistical Area.

History
Orange Lake was platted in 1926.

Geography
Orange Lake is located at  (29.4233, -82.2169).

See also

References

External links

Unincorporated communities in Alachua County, Florida
Unincorporated communities in Marion County, Florida
Unincorporated communities in Florida